The Pechenegs or Patzinaks were a semi-nomadic Turkic ethnic people from Central Asia who spoke the Pecheneg language.

Ethnonym 

The Pechenegs were mentioned as Bjnak, Bjanak or Bajanak in medieval Arabic and Persian texts, as Be-ča-nag in Classical Tibetan documents, and as Pačanak-i in works written in Georgian. Anna Komnene and other Byzantine authors referred to them as Patzinakoi or Patzinakitai. In medieval Latin texts, the Pechenegs were referred to as Pizenaci, Bisseni or Bessi. East Slavic peoples use the terms Pečenegi or Pečenezi (plural of Pečeneg), while the Poles mention them as Pieczyngowie or Piecinigi. The Hungarian word for Pecheneg is Besenyő; the Romanian term is Pecenegi.

According to Max Vasmer  and some other researchers the ethnonym may have derived from the Old Turkic word for "brother-in-law, relative” (baja, baja-naq or bajinaq; Kyrgyz: baja,   and ), implying that it initially referred to an "in-law related clan or tribe".

In Mahmud Kashgari's 11th-century work Dīwān Lughāt al-Turk, Pechenegs were described as "a Turkic nation living around the country of the Rum", where Rum was the Turkic word for the Eastern Roman Empire or Anatolia, and  "a branch of Oghuz Turks"; he subsequently described the Oghuz as being formed of 22 branches, of which the Pecheneg were the 19th.

Pechenegs are mentioned as one of 24 ancient tribes of Oghuzes by 14th-century statesman and historian of Ilkhanate-ruled  Iran Rashid-al-Din Hamadani in his work Jāmiʿ al-Tawārīkh ("Compendium of Chronicles") with the meaning of the ethnonym as "the one who shows eagerness". The 17th-century Khan of the Khanate of Khiva and historian Abu al-Ghazi Bahadur mentions the Pechenegs as bechene among 24 ancient tribes of Turkmens (or Oghuzes) in his book Shajara-i Tarākima  (“Genealogy of the Turkmen") and provides for its meaning as "the one who makes".

Three of the eight Pecheneg "provinces" or clans were collectively known as Kangars. According to Constantine VII Porphyrogenitus, the Kangars received this denomination because "they are more valiant and noble than the rest" of the people "and that is what the title Kangar signifies". Because no Turkic word with a similar meaning is known, Ármin Vámbéry connected the ethnonym to the Kirghiz words kangir ("agile"), kangirmak ("to go out riding") and kani-kara ("black-blooded"), while Carlile Aylmer Macartney associated it with the Chagatai  word gang ("chariot"), semantically related to the Turkic Gaoche.

Omeljan Pritsak proposed that the name had initially been a composite term (Kängär As, mentioned in Old Turkic texts) deriving from the Tocharian word for stone (kank) and the ethnonym As, suggesting that they were Tocharian-speaking or at least formed a confederation consisting of Tocharian, Eastern Iranian and Bulgaric Turkic elements. Their connection with Eastern Iranian elements is hinted at in the remark of al-Biruni regarding a people that "are of the race of al-Lān and that of al-Ās and their language is a mixture of the languages of Khwarazmians and the Badjanak.". If the latter assumption is valid, the Kangars' ethnonym suggests that (East) Iranian elements contributed to the formation of the Pecheneg people but Spinei concedes that Pechenegs were of "a predominantly Turkic character... beyond any doubt". This may be mirrored in the Old Rus translation of Josephus Flavius (ed. Meshcherskiy, 454) which adds "the Yas, as is known, descended from the Pecheneg tribe." On the basis of their fragmentary linguistic remains, scholars view them as Common Turkic-speakers, most probably Kipchak (Németh, followed by Ligeti) or Oguz (Baskakov). Hammer-Purgstall classifies the Chinese Kangju and Byzantine Kangar as purely Turkic name variants of the Kangly; however, Wang Pu's institutional historical work Tang Huiyao apparently distinguishes the Kang(ju) from the Kangheli (aka Kangly). Menges saw in Kang-ar-as the plural-suffix -as, and Klyashtorny the Turkic numerus collectivus -ar-, -er-.

Language 

Mahmud al-Kashgari, an 11th-century man of letters who specialized in Turkic dialects argued that the language spoken by the Pechenegs was a variant of the Cuman and Oghuz idioms. He suggested that foreign influences on the Pechenegs gave rise to phonetical differences between their tongue and the idiom spoken by other Turkic peoples. Anna Komnene likewise stated that the Pechenegs and the Cumans shared a common language. Although the Pecheneg language itself died out centuries ago, the names of the Pecheneg "provinces" recorded by Constantine Porphyrogenitus prove that the Pechenegs spoke a Turkic language. The Pechenegs are thought to have belonged to the Oghuz branch of the Turkic family, but their language is poorly documented and therefore difficult to further classify.

Composition

Byzantine emperor Constantine VII Porphyrogennetos lists eight Pecheneg tribal groupings, four on each side of the Dnieper river, reflecting the bipartite left-right Turkic organization. These eight tribes were in turn divided into 40 sub-tribes, probably clans. Constantine VII also records the names of eight former tribal leaders who had been leading the Pechenegs when they were expelled by the Khazars and Oghuzes. Golden, following Németh and Ligeti, proposes that each tribal name consists of two parts: the first part being an equine coat color, the other the tribal ruler's title.

The Erdim, Čur, and Yula tribes formed the Qangar/Kenger (Greek: Καγγαρ) and were deemed "more valiant and noble than the rest".

Notes

History

Origins and area 
According to Omeljan Pritsak, the Pechenegs are descendants from the ancient Kangars who originate from Tashkent. The Orkhon inscriptions listed the Kangars among the subject peoples of the Eastern Turkic Khaganate. Pritsak says that the Pechenegs' homeland was located between the Aral Sea and the middle course of the Syr Darya, along the important trade routes connecting Central Asia with Eastern Europe, and associates them with Kangars.

According to Constantine Porphyrogenitus, writing in c. 950, Patzinakia, the Pecheneg realm, stretched west as far as the Siret River (or even the Eastern Carpathian Mountains), and was four days distant from "Tourkias" (i.e. Hungary).

Paul Pelliot originated the proposal that the Book of Suia 7th-century Chinese workpreserved the earliest record on the Pechenegs. The book mentioned a people named Bĕirù, who had settled near the Ēnqū and Alan peoples (identified as Onogurs and Alans, respectively), to the east of Fulin (or the Eastern Roman Empire). Victor Spinei emphasizes that the Pechenegs' association with the Bĕirù is "uncertain". He proposes that an 8th-century Uighur envoy's report, which survives in Tibetan translation, contains the first certain reference to the Pechenegs. The report recorded an armed conflict between the Be-ča-nag and the Hor (Uyghurs or Oghuz Turks) peoples in the region of the river Syr Darya.

Ibn Khordadbeh (c. 820 – 912 CE), Mahmud al-Kashgari (11th century), Muhammad al-Idrisi (1100–1165), and many other Muslim scholars agree that the Pechenegs belonged to the Turkic peoples. The Russian Primary Chronicle stated that the "Torkmens, Pechenegs, Torks, and Polovcians" descended from "the godless sons of Ishmael, who had been sent as a chastisement to the Christians".

Westward migration 

The Turkic Khaganate collapsed in 744 which gave rise to a series of intertribal confrontations in the Eurasian steppes. The Karluks attacked the Oghuz Turks, forcing them to launch a westward migration towards the Pechenegs' lands. The Uighur envoy's report testifies that the Oghuz and Pecheneg waged war against each other already in the 8th century, most probably for the control of the trade routes. The Oghuz made an alliance with the Karluks and Kimaks and defeated the Pechenegs and their allies in a battle near the Lake Aral before 850, according to the 10th-century scholar, Al-Masudi. Most Pechenegs launched a new migration towards the Volga River, but some groups were forced to join the Oghuz. The latter formed the 19th tribe of the Oghuz tribal federation in the 11th century.

The Pechenegs who left their homeland settled between the Ural and Volga rivers. According to Gardizi and other Muslim scholars who based their works on 9th-century sources, the Pechenegs' new territory was quite large, with a 30-day-walk extension, and were bordered by the Cumans, Khazars, Oghuz Turks and Slavs.

The same sources also narrate that the Pechenegs made regular raids against their neighbors, in particular against the Khazars and the latter's vassals, the Burtas, and sold their captives. The Khazars made an alliance with the Ouzes against the Pechenegs and attacked them from two directions. Outnumbered by the enemy, the Pechenegs were forced into a new westward migration. They marched across the Khazar Khaganate, invaded the dwelling places of the Hungarians, and expelled them from the lands along the Kuban River and the upper course of the river Donets. There is no consensual date for this second migration of the Pechenegs: Pritsak argues that it took place around 830, but Kristó suggests that it could hardly occur before the 850s.

The Pechenegs settled along the rivers Donets and Kuban. It is plausible that the distinction between the "Turkic Pechenegs" and "Khazar Pechenegs" mentioned in the 10th-century Hudud al-'alam had its origin in this period. The Hudud al-'Alama late 10th-century Persian geographydistinguished two Pecheneg groups, referring to those who lived along the Donets as "Turkic Pechenegs", and to those along the Kuban as "Khazarian Pechenegs". Spinei proposes that the latter denomination most probably refers to Pecheneg groups accepting Khazar suzerainty, implies that some Pecheneg tribes had been forced to acknowledge the Khazars supremacy.

In addition to these two branches, a third group of Pechenegs existed in this period: Constantine Porphyrogenitus and Ibn Fadlan mention that those who decided not to leave their homeland were incorporated into the Oghuz federation of Turkic tribes.

However, it is uncertain whether this group's formation is connected to the Pechenegs' first or second migration (as it is proposed by Pritsak and Golden, respectively). According to Mahmud al-Kashgari, one of the Üçok clans of the Oghuz Turks was still formed by Pechenegs in the 1060s.

Alliance with Byzantium 

In the 9th century, the Byzantines became allied with the Pechenegs, using them to fend off other, more dangerous tribes such as Kievan Rus' and the Magyars (Hungarians).

The Uzes, another Turkic steppe people, eventually expelled the Pechenegs from their homeland; in the process, they also seized most of their livestock and other goods. An alliance of Oghuz, Kimeks, and Karluks was also pressing the Pechenegs, but another group, the Samanids, defeated that alliance. Driven further west by the Khazars and Cumans by 889, the Pechenegs in turn drove the Magyars west of the Dnieper River by 892.

Bulgarian Tsar Simeon I employed the Pechenegs to help fend off the Magyars. The Pechenegs were so successful that they drove out the Magyars remaining in Etelköz and the Pontic steppes, forcing them westward   towards the Pannonian plain, where they later founded the Hungarian state.

Late history and decline 

By the 9th and 10th centuries, Pechenegs controlled much of the steppes of southeast Europe and the Crimean Peninsula.  Although an important factor in the region at the time, like most nomadic tribes their concept of statecraft failed to go beyond random attacks on neighbours and spells as mercenaries for other powers.

In the 9th century the Pechenegs began a period of wars against Kievan Rus'. For more than two centuries they had launched raids into the lands of Rus', which sometimes escalated into full-scale wars (like the 920 war on the Pechenegs by Igor of Kiev, reported in the Primary Chronicle). The Pecheneg wars against Kievan Rus' caused the Slavs from Walachian territories to gradually migrate north of the Dniestr in the 10th and 11th centuries.  Rus'/Pecheneg temporary military alliances also occurred however, as during the Byzantine campaign in 943 led by Igor. In 968 the Pechenegs attacked and besieged Kiev; some joined the Prince of Kiev, Sviatoslav I, in his Byzantine campaign of 970–971, though eventually they ambushed and killed the Kievan prince in 972.  According to the Primary Chronicle, the Pecheneg Khan Kurya made a chalice from Sviatoslav's skull, in accordance with the custom of steppe nomads.  The fortunes of the Rus'-Pecheneg confrontation swung during the reign of Vladimir I of Kiev (990–995), who founded the town of Pereyaslav upon the site of his victory over the Pechenegs, followed by the defeat of the Pechenegs during the reign of Yaroslav I the Wise in 1036. Shortly thereafter, other nomadic peoples replaced the weakened Pechenegs in the Pontic steppe: the Cumans and the Torks. According to Mykhailo Hrushevsky (History of Ukraine-Ruthenia), after its defeat near Kiev the Pecheneg Horde  moved towards the Danube, crossed the river, and disappeared out of the Pontic steppes.

Pecheneg mercenaries served under the Byzantines at the Battle of Manzikert. After centuries of fighting involving all their neighbours—the Byzantine Empire, Bulgaria, Kievan Rus', Khazaria, and the Magyars—the Pechenegs were annihilated as an independent force  in 1091 at the Battle of Levounion by a combined Byzantine and Cuman army under Byzantine Emperor Alexios I Komnenos. Alexios I recruited the defeated Pechenegs, whom he settled in the district of Moglena (today in Macedonia) into a tagma "of the Moglena Pechenegs". Attacked again in 1094 by the Cumans, many Pechenegs were slain or absorbed. The Byzantines defeated the Pechenegs again at the Battle of Beroia in 1122, on the territory of modern-day Bulgaria. With time the Pechenegs south of the Danube lost their national identity and became fully assimilated, mostly with Romanians and Bulgarians. Significant communities settled in the Hungarian kingdom, around 150 villages.

In the 12th century, according to Byzantine historian John Kinnamos, the Pechenegs fought as mercenaries for the Byzantine Emperor Manuel I Komnenos in southern Italy against the Norman king of Sicily, William the Bad. A group of Pechenegs was present at the battle of Andria in 1155.

The Pechenegs as a group were last mentioned in 1168 as members of Turkic tribes known in the chronicles as the "Chorni Klobuky (Black Hats)". It is likely that the Pecheneg population of Hungary was decimated by the Mongol invasion of Hungary, but names of Pecheneg origin continue to be reported in official documents. The title of "Comes Bissenorum" (Count of the Pechenegs) lasted for at least another 200 years.

In 15th-century Hungary, some people adopted the surname Besenyö (Hungarian for "Pecheneg"); they were most numerous in the county of Tolna. One of the earliest introductions of Islam into Eastern Europe came about through the work of an early 11th-century Muslim prisoner who was captured by the Byzantines. The Muslim prisoner was brought into the Besenyő territory of the Pechenegs, where he taught and converted individuals to Islam. In the late 12th century, Abu Hamid al-Gharnati referred to Hungarian Pechenegs – probably Muslims – living disguised as Christians. In the southeast of Serbia, there is a village called Pečenjevce founded by Pechenegs. After war with Byzantium, the remnants of the tribes found refuge in the area, where they established their settlement.

Settlements bearing the name Pecheneg
 Besenyszög, Hungary
 Besenyőd, Hungary
Besenyőtelek, Hungary
Besnyő, Hungary
Bešenovački Prnjavor, Serbia
Bešeňov, Slovakia
Bešeňová, Slovakia
Bešenovo, Serbia
Beščeně, a part of Kunovice, Czech Republic
Biçənək, Azerbaijan
Ládbesenyő, Hungary
Máriabesnyő a part of Gödöllő, Hungary
Pechenihy, Ukraine
Pecineaga, Romania
Pecinișca, Romania
Peçenek, Turkey
Pečenice, Slovakia
Pečenjevce, Serbia
Pečeneg Ilova, Bosnia and Herzegovina
Pečeňady, Slovakia
Pöttsching, Austria
Szirmabesenyő, Hungary

Leaders 
 Kurya c. 970s
 Metiga c. 980s
 Kuchug c. 990s
 Kızıl Beg Western Anatolia  c. 1184-(????)s

See also 
Kangar union
Chorni Klobuky
Timeline of the Turkic peoples (500–1300)
Kankalis
Kipchaks
Petržalka
Cumans
Khazars
PKP Pecheneg, A Russian made general-purpose machine gun named after the Turkic tribe

Notes

Footnotes

References

Primary sources 
Anna Comnena: The Alexiad (Translated by E. R. A. Sewter) (1969). Penguin Books. .
Constantine Porphyrogenitus: De Administrando Imperio (Greek text edited by Gyula Moravcsik, English translation b Romillyi J. H. Jenkins) (1967). Dumbarton Oaks Center for Byzantine Studies. .

Secondary sources

Further reading

External links 

www.patzinakia.ro
The Primary Chronicle
Of the Pechenegs, and how many advantages

 
Turkic peoples of Europe
10th century in Kievan Rus'
Medieval Kingdom of Hungary
Ethnic groups in Hungary
Islam in Hungary
Pastoralists
Nomadic groups in Eurasia
Moldova in the Early Middle Ages
Romania in the Early Middle Ages
Late Byzantine-era tribes in the Balkans
11th century in Kievan Rus'
History of the western steppe
Extinct Turkic peoples